Last Building Burning is the fifth studio album by American rock band Cloud Nothings. It was released on October 19, 2018 via Carpark Records.

Production and release
The album was recorded in eight days with producer Randall Dunn, who is best known for his work in producing drone music and heavy metal music. Tracking took place at Sonic Ranch, a studio in the border town of Tornillo, Texas. The album was announced on August 13, 2018, which coincided with the release of the album's first single, "The Echo of the World." Prior to the album's release, two further singles were released: "Leave Him Now" and "So Right So Clean."

Reception

According to Metacritic, Last Building Burning has received an aggregated score of 79/100 based on 13 reviews, indicating "generally favorable reviews".

Track listing
All music and lyrics by Dylan Baldi.

Personnel
Cloud Nothings
 Dylan Baldi - lead vocals, guitar, backing vocals
 Chris Brown - guitar, backing vocals
 T.J. Duke - bass, backing vocals
 Jayson Gerycz - drums

Additional personnel
 Randall Dunn - production, mixing
 Jason Ward - mastering
 Rob Carmichael - design

Charts

References

2018 albums
Cloud Nothings albums
Carpark Records albums
Wichita Recordings albums
Albums produced by Randall Dunn
Albums recorded at Sonic Ranch